The Middle Bronze Age Cold Epoch was a period of unusually cold climate in the North Atlantic region that lasted about from 1800 BC to 1500 BC. 
 It was followed by the Bronze Age Optimum (1500—900 BC).

During the Middle Bronze Age Cold Epoch, a series of severe volcanic eruptions occurred, including Mount Vesuvius (Avellino eruption, about 1660 BC), Mount Aniakchak (about 1645 BC), and Thera (Minoan eruption, about 1620 BC).

References

History of climate variability and change
Bronze Age
Holocene